Wendelin Rauch (30 August 1885 – 28 April 1954) was a German Roman Catholic clergyman.

Rauch was born in Zell am Andelsbach. He served as archbishop of Freiburg from 1948 until his death at Freiburg im Breisgau, aged 68.

References

External links
 
 Rauch on catholic-hierarchy.org

Archbishops of Freiburg
1885 births
1954 deaths
People from Pfullendorf
20th-century Roman Catholic archbishops in Germany
20th-century German Roman Catholic priests